The second season of Doctor Doctor (known as The Heart Guy outside of Australasia), an Australian drama television series, premiered on Nine Network on 16 August 2017.

Cast
 Rodger Corser as Hugh Knight 
 Nicole da Silva as Charlie Knight (née Pereira)
 Ryan Johnson as Matt Knight
 Tina Bursill as Meryl Knight
 Hayley McElhinney as Penny Cartwright
 Chloe Bayliss as Hayley Mills Knight
 Matt Castley as Ajax Cross Knight
 Belinda Bromilow as Betty Bell
 Brittany Clark as Mia Halston 
 Charles Wu as Ken Liu
 Steve Bisley as Jim Knight

Episodes

Reception

Ratings

Accolades

AACTA Awards (2017)
 Nominated: AACTA Award for Best Lead in a Television Drama — Tina Bursill
Logie Awards (2018)
 Nominated: Gold Logie Award for Most Popular Personality on Australian Television — Rodger Corser 
 Nominated: Logie Award for Best Actor — Rodger Corser
 Nominated: Logie Award for Most Outstanding Actor — Rodger Corser 
 Nominated: Logie Award for Most Popular Drama Program — Doctor Doctor 
 Nominated: Logie Award for Best Drama Program — Doctor Doctor
TV Tonight Awards (2018)
 Nominated: TV Tonight Award for Best Australian Drama – Doctor Doctor
 Nominated: TV Tonight Award for Favourite Male – Rodger Corser

Home media

International release

References

2017 Australian television seasons